This Is Hazelville is the debut album of the English rock group Captain, produced by Trevor Horn.

Track listing
All songs written by Captain

 Hazelville (5:04)
 Glorious (4:30)
 Broke (3:37)
 East. West. North. South (3:50)
Frontline (3:59)
 Build a Life (3:46)
 Wax (4:10)
 This Heart Keeps Beating for Me (2:58)
 Western High (4:42)
 Summer Rain (3:43)
 Accidie (5:17)

Personnel

Captain
 Rik Flynn — lead vocals, guitars, 12-string guitars, mandolin, keyboards
 Clare Szembek — vocals, piano, keyboards, marimba, xylophone, percussion, vibraphone, glockenspiel
 Reuben Humphries — drums, percussion, vocals, keyboards, xylophone
 Mario Athanasiou — guitars
 Alex Yeoman — bass, double bass, keyboards

Additional musicians
 Steve Sidwell — trumpet, flugelhorn
 Taz Mattar — programming, keyboards

This Is Hazelville
This Is Hazelville
Captain (band) albums